The Chattogram Challengers (Chittagonian/) is a franchise cricket team which participates in the Bangladesh Premier League (BPL). The franchise was founded in 2012 & based on Chattogram City, Chattogram.

Franchise history

The Chattogram franchise joined the BPL as one of its original members in 2012, and appeared in the final in 2013 under the captaincy of Mahmudullah Riyad and coaching of Khaled Mahmud. The team changed its name from Chittagong Kings after a change of ownership in 2015. And Chittagong Vikings was founded 1 December 2015. It was owned by DBL Sports Limited, a concern of DBL Group.

DBL Sports Limited terminated the ownership of the team on 29 July 2019. They were later reinstated after Bangladesh Cricket Board (BCB) changed the format of the tournament and acquired ownership for all the teams for the 2019–20 season.

Chittagong Vikings participated in the first two seasons as ‘Chittagong Kings’ and was owned by SQ sports. After SQ Sports was charged with fixing and delaying payments to players, it was banned from participating in cricketing activities so were all the other franchisees owners for corruption scandals.

Since 2015, DBL Group took charge of the ownership and change the name to Chittagong Vikings. All other franchises have gone through and ownership and name change, other than Rangpur Riders.

Season history

BPL 01

In the inaugural season, Chittagong Kings had a strong squad with the likes of Mahmudullah Riyad, Dwayne Bravo, Kevon Cooper and Jason Roy. However, even with such a strong team on paper, they couldn't show their full potential on the field. They were disqualified controversially as Barisal Burners were the ones who went through to the knockout stage. The team management were very unhappy with the decision, as their disqualification was announced at 2 am at the day of the knockout match.

BPL 02

The team retained Mahmudullah and Jason Roy while they gained some reinforcements in the likes of David Miller and Ryan ten Doeschate. This time, they team performed really well, winning their first three games in a row and advancing to the playoffs. They reached the finals but couldn't lift the trophy as Dhaka Gladiators successfully defended their championship.

BPL 03

Chittagong Vikings emerged as the new representative team of the port city in the BPL, under a new name and ownership of DBL Group. They team selected Tamim Iqbal as their icon player and had some overseas players such as Mohammad Amir, who returned after a 5-year ban for fixing, Tillakaratne Dilshan, the Akmal brothers and South African spinner Robin Peterson.

In the field, the Vikings wasn't at their best while their pacer Amir was with the ball. They finished as the bottom of the table, hence being disqualified.

BPL 04

The Vikings retained Tamim as icon while they signed some big names such as Chris Gayle and Shoaib Malik

The team was pretty good throughout the tournament but not the best. They managed to get through to the playoffs but lost to the newcomer Rajshahi Kings in the eliminator.

BPL 05

The Vikings didn't boast the strongest squad on paper. They had Soumya Sarkar as their icon player and had signed Luke Ronchi, Sikandar Raza, Najibullah Zadran and more. The team was initially lead by Misbah-ul-Haq but Ronchi took over after he was dropped due to poor form.

On the field, Ronchi carried the team with the bat and Raza supported throughout the middle. Local players underperformed which cost them heavily. The finished at the bottom registering only three wins on their belt.

BPL 06

The team didn't want to participate in the BPL this time but they were requested by the BPL Governing Council. They team retained Ronchi, Raza and Sunzamul Islam

The team didn't have an A+ (icon) until minutes before the commencement of the draft. Mushfiqur Rahim was the only A+ player without a team. The highest price for an icon 60 lacs Taka ($75,000) while Mushfiqur demanded 1 Croce 20 lacs Taka ($150,000). The Vikings management offered a maximum price of maximum 80 lacs Taka ($100,000). After some negotiations with the Vikings team management, Mushfiqur and the BPL Governing Council, Mushfiq agreed to join the Vikings fleet as their A+ player.

In the draft, the Vikings were very active, signing the likes of Cameron Delport, Dasun Shanaka and Najibullah Zadran. Mosaddek Hossain, Abu Jayed and Khaled Ahmed were a part of their local signings. However, their signing of Mohammad Ashraful, returning to professional cricket after serving a 5-year ban for fixing, made headlines.

The Vikings started off strong early on but gradually slipped as the tournament progressed. The finished 4th in the points table and lost to Dhaka Dynamites in the Eliminator.

BPL 07

During the player's direct signing period, a Conflict of Interests aroused between BCB and all other franchise. Subsequently, in September 2019, BCB made some changes in rules and regulations for this season and eliminating all franchises, BCB took over the charge of the current BPL and decided to run this current tournament by the board itself and named the tournament as Bangabandhu BPL T20 2019 in order to pay homage to Sheikh Mujibur Rahman on his birth centenary. The team was owned and managed by BCB itself.

Akhtar Group acquired sponsorship rights of Chittagong and named the team ‘Chattogram Challengers’. They signed the likes of Chris Gayle, Mahmudullah Riyad this time they performed well in group stage, winning eight matches and four losses

BPL 08

After a year break due to COVID-19 pandemic, the eighth edition of the BPL was scheduled to be played from 21 January to 18 February 2022. In this edition Delta Sports joined Akhtar Group as the franchise owner. Before the drafts the franchise recruited left-arm spinner Nasum Ahmed and three foreign players Benny Howell, Kennar Lewis and Will Jacks as their direct signing.

Seasons & Drafts

Sponsors

Squads

References

External links 
 Website
 Facebook Page

Cricket clubs established in 2015
Sports clubs in Bangladesh
Bangladesh Premier League teams
Cricket in Chittagong
2015 establishments in Bangladesh
Organisations based in Chittagong